Sindh (historically romanized as Sind) is a province of Pakistan. Located in the southeastern region of the country, Sindh is the third-largest province of Pakistan by land area and the second-largest province by population after Punjab. It is bordered by the Pakistani provinces of Balochistan to the west and north-west and Punjab to the north. It shares an International border with the Indian states of Gujarat and Rajasthan to the east; it is also bounded by the Arabian Sea to the south. Sindh's landscape consists mostly of alluvial plains flanking the Indus River, the Thar Desert in the eastern portion of the province along the international border with India, and the Kirthar Mountains in the western portion of the province.

The economy of Sindh is the second-largest in Pakistan after the province of Punjab; its provincial capital of Karachi is the most populous city in the country as well as its main financial hub. Sindh is home to a large portion of Pakistan's industrial sector and contains two of the country's busiest commercial seaports: Port Qasim and the Port of Karachi. The remainder of Sindh consists of an agriculture-based economy and produces fruits, consumer items and vegetables for other parts of the country.

Sindh is sometimes referred to as the Bab-ul Islam, as it was one of the first regions of the Indian subcontinent to fall under Islamic rule. Parts of the modern-day province were intermittently subject to raids by the Rashidun army during the early Muslim conquests, but the region did not fall under Muslim rule until the Arab invasion of Sind occurred under the Umayyad Caliphate, headed by Muhammad ibn Qasim in 712 CE. Ethnic Sindhi people constitute the largest group in the province; Sindh is also the place of residence for the overwhelming majority of Muhajirs, a multiethnic group of Indian Muslims who migrated to the region after the Partition of British India in 1947. The province is well known for its distinct culture, which is strongly influenced by Sufism, an important marker of Sindhi identity for both Hindus and Muslims. Several important Sindhi Sufi shrines are located throughout the province and attract millions of devotees annually.

Sindh is prominent for its history during the Bronze Age under the Indus Valley civilization, and is home to two UNESCO-designated World Heritage Sites: the Makli Necropolis and Mohenjo-daro.

Etymology 
The Greeks who conquered Sindh in 325 BCE under the command of Alexander the Great referred to the Indus River as Indós, hence the modern Indus. The ancient Iranians referred to everything east of the river Indus as hind. The word Sindh is a Persian derivative of the Sanskrit term Sindhu, meaning "river" - a reference to Indus River.

Southworth suggests that the name Sindhu is in turn derived from Cintu, a Dravidian word for date palm, a tree commonly found in Sindh.

The previous spelling "Sind" (from the Perso-Arabic ) was discontinued in 1988 by an amendment passed in Sindh Assembly, and is now spelt "Sindh."

History

Ancient era 

Sindh and surrounding areas contain the ruins of the Indus Valley Civilization. There are remnants of thousand-year-old cities and structures, with a notable example in Sindh being that of Mohenjo Daro. Built around 2500 BCE, it was one of the largest settlements of the ancient Indus civilisation, with features such as standardized bricks, street grids, and covered sewerage systems. It was one of the world's earliest major cities, contemporaneous with the civilizations of ancient Egypt, Mesopotamia, Minoan Crete, and Caral-Supe. Mohenjo-daro was abandoned in the 19th century BCE as the Indus Valley Civilization declined, and the site was not rediscovered until the 1920s. Significant excavation has since been conducted at the site of the city, which was designated a UNESCO World Heritage Site in 1980. The site is currently threatened by erosion and improper restoration. A gradual drying of the region during the 3rd millennium BCE may have been the initial stimulus for its urbanisation. Eventually it also reduced the water supply enough to cause the civilisation's demise and to disperse its population to the east.

During the Bronze Age, the territory of Sindh was known as Sindhu-Sauvīra, covering the lower Indus Valley, with its southern border being the Indian Ocean and its northern border being the Pañjāb around Multān. The capital of Sindhu-Sauvīra was named Roruka and Vītabhaya or Vītībhaya, and corresponds to the mediaeval Arohṛ and the modern-day Rohṛī. The Achaemenids conquered the region and established the satrapy of Hindush. The territory may have corresponded to the area covering the lower and central Indus basin (present day Sindh and the southern Punjab regions of Pakistan). Alternatively, some authors consider that Hindush may have been located in the Punjab area. These areas remained under Persian control until the invasion by Alexander. 

Alexander conquered parts of Sindh after Punjab for few years and appointed his general Peithon as governor. He constructed a harbour at the city of Patala in Sindh. Chandragupta Maurya fought Alexander's successor in the east, Seleucus I Nicator, when the latter invaded. In a peace treaty, Seleucus ceded all territories west of the Indus River and offered a marriage, including a portion of Bactria, while Chandragupta granted Seleucus 500 elephants.

Following a century of Mauryan rule which ended by 180 BCE, the region came under the Indo-Greeks, followed by the Indo Scythians, who ruled with their capital at Minnagara. Later on, Sasanian rulers from the reign of Shapur I claimed control of the Sindh area in their inscriptions, known as Hind.

The local Rai dynasty emerged from Sindh and reigned for a period of 144 years, concurrent with the Huna invasions of North India. Aror was noted to be the capital. The Brahmin dynasty of Sindh succeeded the Rai dynasty. Most of the information about its existence comes from the Chach Nama, a historical account of the Chach-Brahmin dynasty. After the empire's fall in 712, though the empire had ended, its dynasty's members administered parts of Sindh under the Umayyad Caliphate's Caliphal province of Sind.

Medieval era 
After the death of the Islamic prophet Muhammad, the Arab expansion towards the east reached the Sindh region beyond Persia. The connection between the Sindh and Islam was established by the initial Muslim invasions during the Rashidun Caliphate. Al-Hakim ibn Jabalah al-Abdi, who attacked Makran in the year 649 CE, was an early partisan of Ali ibn Abu Talib. During the caliphate of Ali, many Jats of Sindh had come under the influence of Shi'ism and some even participated in the Battle of Camel and died fighting for Ali. Under the Umayyads (661–750 CE), many Shias sought asylum in the region of Sindh, to live in relative peace in the remote area. Ziyad Hindi is one of those refugees. The first clash with the Hindu kings of Sindh took place in 636 (15 A.H.) under Caliph Umar ibn al-Khattab with the governor of Bahrain, Uthman ibn Abu-al-Aas, dispatching naval expeditions against Thane and Bharuch and Debal. Al-Baladhuri states they were victorious at Debal but doesn't mention the results of other two raids. However, the Chach Nama states that the raid of Debal was defeated and its governor killed the leader of the raids. These raids were thought to be triggered by a later pirate attack on Umayyad ships. Baladhuri adds that this stopped any more incursions until the reign of Uthman.

In 712, Mohammed Bin Qasim defeated the Brahmin dynasty and annexed it to the Umayyad Caliphate. This marked the beginning of Islam in the Indian subcontinent. The Habbari dynasty ruled much of Greater Sindh, as a semi-independent emirate from 854 to 1024. Beginning with the rule of 'Umar bin Abdul Aziz al-Habbari in 854 CE, the region became semi-independent from the Abbasid Caliphate in 861, while continuing to nominally pledge allegiance to the Abbasid Caliph in Baghdad. The Habbaris ruled Sindh until they were defeated by Sultan Mahmud Ghaznavi in 1026, who then went on to destroy the old Habbari capital of Mansura, and annex the region to the Ghaznavid Empire, thereby ending Arab rule of Sindh.

The Soomra dynasty was a local Sindhi muslim dynasty that ruled between early 11th century and the 14th century. Later chroniclers like Ali ibn al-Athir (c. late 12th c.) and Ibn Khaldun (c. late 14th c.) attributed the fall of Habbarids to Mahmud of Ghazni, lending credence to the argument of Hafif being the last Habbarid. The Soomras appear to have established themselves as a regional power in this power vacuum. The Ghurids and Ghaznavids continued to rule parts of Sindh, across the eleventh and early twelfth century, alongside Soomrus. The precise delineations are not yet known but Sommrus were probably centered in lower Sindh. Some of them were adherents of Isma'ilism. One of their kings Shimuddin Chamisar had submitted to Iltutmish, the Sultan of Delhi, and was allowed to continue on as a vassal.

The Sammas overthrew the Soomras soon after 1335 and the last Soomra ruler took shelter with the governor of Gujarat, under the protection of Muhammad bin Tughluq, the sultan of Delhi. Mohammad bin Tughlaq made an expedition against Sindh in 1351 and died at Sondha, possibly in an attempt to restore the Soomras. With this, the Sammas became independent. The next sultan, Firuz Shah Tughlaq attacked Sindh in 1365 and 1367, unsuccessfully, but with reinforcements from Delhi he later obtained Banbhiniyo's surrender. For a period the Sammas were therefore subject to Delhi again. Later, as the Sultanate of Delhi collapsed they became fully independent. Jam Unar was the founder of Samma dynasty mentioned by Ibn Battuta. The Samma civilization contributed significantly to the evolution of the Indo-Islamic architectural style. Thatta is famous for its necropolis, which covers 10 square km on the Makli Hill. It has left its mark in Sindh with magnificent structures including the Makli Necropolis of its royals in Thatta. They were later overthrown by the Turkic Arghuns in the late 15th century.

Modern era
In the late 16th century, Sindh was brought into the Mughal Empire by Akbar, himself born in the Rajputana kingdom in Umerkot in Sindh. Mughal rule from their provincial capital of Thatta was to last in lower Sindh until the early 18th century, while upper Sindh was ruled by the indigenous Kalhora dynasty holding power, consolidating their rule from their capital of Khudabad, before shifting to Hyderabad from 1768 onwards.

The Talpurs succeeded the Kalhoras and four branches of the dynasty were established. One ruled lower Sindh from the city of Hyderabad, another ruled over upper Sindh from the city of Khairpur, a third ruled around the eastern city of Mirpur Khas, and a fourth was based in Tando Muhammad Khan. They were ethnically Baloch, and for most of their rule, they were subordinate to the Durrani Empire and were forced to pay tribute to them.

They ruled from 1783, until 1843, when they were in turn defeated by the British at the Battle of Miani and Battle of Dubbo.  The northern Khairpur branch of the Talpur dynasty, however, continued to maintain a degree of sovereignty during British rule as the princely state of Khairpur, whose ruler elected to join the new Dominion of Pakistan in October 1947 as an autonomous region, before being fully amalgamated into West Pakistan in 1955.

British Raj 

The British conquered Sindh in 1843. General Charles Napier is said to have reported victory to the Governor General with a one-word telegram, namely "Peccavi" – or "I have sinned" (Latin). The British had two objectives in their rule of Sindh: the consolidation of British rule and the use of Sindh as a market for British products and a source of revenue and raw materials. With the appropriate infrastructure in place, the British hoped to utilise Sindh for its economic potential. The British incorporated Sindh, some years later after annexing it, into the Bombay Presidency. Distance from the provincial capital, Bombay, led to grievances that Sindh was neglected in contrast to other parts of the Presidency. The merger of Sindh into Punjab province was considered from time to time but was turned down because of British disagreement and Sindhi opposition, both from Muslims and Hindus, to being annexed to Punjab.

Later, desire for a separate administrative status for Sindh grew. At the annual session of the Indian National Congress in 1913, a Sindhi Hindu put forward the demand for Sindh's separation from the Bombay Presidency on the grounds of Sindh's unique cultural character. This reflected the desire of Sindh's predominantly Hindu commercial class to free itself from competing with the more powerful Bombay's business interests. Meanwhile, Sindhi politics was characterised in the 1920s by the growing importance of Karachi and the Khilafat Movement. A number of Sindhi pirs, descendants of Sufi saints who had proselytised in Sindh, joined the Khilafat Movement, which propagated the protection of the Ottoman Caliphate, and those pirs who did not join the movement found a decline in their following. The pirs generated huge support for the Khilafat cause in Sindh. Sindh came to be at the forefront of the Khilafat Movement.

Although Sindh had a cleaner record of communal harmony than other parts of India, the province's Muslim elite and emerging Muslim middle class demanded separation of Sindh from Bombay Presidency as a safeguard for their own interests. In this campaign, local Sindhi Muslims identified ‘Hindu’ with Bombay instead of Sindh. Sindhi Hindus were seen as representing the interests of Bombay instead of the majority of Sindhi Muslims. Sindhi Hindus, for the most part, opposed the separation of Sindh from Bombay. Although Sindh had a culture of religious syncretism, communal harmony and tolerance due to Sindh's strong Sufi culture in which both Sindhi Muslims and Sindhi Hindus partook, both the Muslim landed elite, waderas, and the Hindu commercial elements, banias, collaborated in oppressing the predominantly Muslim peasantry of Sindh who were economically exploited. Sindhi Muslims eventually demanded the separation of Sindh from the Bombay Presidency, a move opposed by Sindhi Hindus.

In Sindh's first provincial election after its separation from Bombay in 1936, economic interests were an essential factor of politics informed by religious and cultural issues. Due to British policies, much land in Sindh was transferred from Muslim to Hindu hands over the decades. Religious tensions rose in Sindh over the Sukkur Manzilgah issue where Muslims and Hindus disputed over an abandoned mosque in proximity to an area sacred to Hindus. The Sindh Muslim League exploited the issue and agitated for the return of the mosque to Muslims. Consequentially, a thousand members of the Muslim League were imprisoned. Eventually, due to panic the government restored the mosque to Muslims.The separation of Sindh from Bombay Presidency triggered Sindhi Muslim nationalists to support the Pakistan Movement. Even while the Punjab and North-West Frontier Province were ruled by parties hostile to the Muslim League, Sindh remained loyal to Jinnah. Although the prominent Sindhi Muslim nationalist G.M. Syed left the All India Muslim League in the mid-1940s and his relationship with Jinnah never improved, the overwhelming majority of Sindhi Muslims supported the creation of Pakistan, seeing in it their deliverance.  Sindhi support for the Pakistan Movement arose from the desire of the Sindhi Muslim business class to drive out their Hindu competitors. The Muslim League's rise to becoming the party with the strongest support in Sindh was in large part linked to its winning over of the religious pir families. Although the Muslim League had previously fared poorly in the 1937 elections in Sindh, when local Sindhi Muslim parties won more seats, the Muslim League's cultivation of support from local pirs in 1946 helped it gain a foothold in the province, it didn't take long for the overwhelming majority of Sindhi Muslims to campaign for the creation of Pakistan.

Partition (1947) 
In 1947, violence did not constitute a major part of the Sindhi partition experience, unlike in Punjab. There were very few incidents of violence on Sindh, in part due to the Sufi-influenced culture of religious tolerance and in part that Sindh was not divided and was instead made part of Pakistan in its entirety. Sindhi Hindus who left generally did so out of a fear of persecution, rather than persecution itself, because of the arrival of Muslim refugees from India. Sindhi Hindus differentiated between the local Sindhi Muslims and the migrant Muslims from India. A large number of Sindhi Hindus travelled to India by sea, to the ports of Bombay, Porbandar, Veraval and Okha.

Demographics

Population 

Sindh has the second highest Human Development Index out of all of Pakistan's provinces at 0.628. The 2017 Census of Pakistan indicated a population of 47.9 million.

The major ethnic group of the province is the Sindhis, but there is also a significant presence of other groups. Sindhis of Baloch origin make up about 30% of the total Sindhi population (although they speak Sindhi or Saraiki as their native tongue), while Urdu-speaking Muhajirs make up over 19% of the total population of the province, while Punjabi are 10% and Pashtuns represent 7%. 

In August 1947, before the partition of India, the total population of Sindh was 3,887,070 out of which 2,832,000 (around 73%) were Muslims, 1,015,000 (around 26%) were Hindus and the remaining were Sikhs and Jains.

Religion 

Islam in Sindh has a long history, starting with the capture of Sindh by Muhammad Bin Qasim in 712 CE. Over time, the majority of the population in Sindh converted to Islam, especially in rural areas. Today, Muslims make up over 90% of the population, and are more dominant in urban than rural areas. Islam in Sindh has a strong Sufi ethos with numerous Muslim saints and mystics, such as the Sufi poet Shah Abdul Latif Bhittai, having lived in Sindh historically. One popular legend which highlights the strong Sufi presence in Sindh is that 125,000 Sufi saints and mystics are buried on Makli Hill near Thatta. The development of Sufism in Sindh was similar to the development of Sufism in other parts of the Muslim world. In the 16th century two Sufi tareeqat (orders) – Qadria and Naqshbandia – were introduced in Sindh. Sufism continues to play an important role in the daily lives of Sindhis.

Sindh also has Pakistan's highest percentage of Hindu overall, which accounts 8.7% of the population, roughly around 4.2 million people, and 13.3% of the province's rural population as per 2017 Pakistani census report. These numbers also include the scheduled caste population, which stands at 1.7% of the total in Sindh (or 3.1% in rural areas), and is believed to have been under-reported, with some community members instead counted under the main Hindu category. Although, Pakistan Hindu Council claimed that there are 6,842,526 Hindus living in Sindh Province covering around 14.29% of the region's population. Umerkot district in the Thar Desert is Pakistan's only Hindu-majority district. The Shri Ramapir Temple in Tandoallahyar whose annual festival is the second largest Hindu pilgrimage in Pakistan is in Sindh. Sindh is also the only province in Pakistan to have a separate law for governing Hindu marriages.

Per community estimates, there are approximately 10,000 Sikhs in Sindh.

Languages 

According to the 2017 census, the most widely spoken language in the province is Sindhi, the first language of % of the population. It is followed by Urdu (%), Pashto (%), Punjabi (%), Saraiki (%), Balochi (2%) and Hindko.

Other minority languages include Kutchi, Gujarati, Aer, Bagri, Bhaya, Brahui, Dhatki, Ghera, Goaria, Gurgula, Jadgali, Jandavra, Jogi, Kabutra, Kachi Koli, Parkari Koli, Wadiyari Koli, Loarki, Marwari, Sansi, and Vaghri.

Karachi city is Sindh's most multiethnic city. Urdu-speakers form a plurality, while Pashtuns are the second-largest group. Sindhis themselves are 10% of the population in Karachi, a number that has increased due to migration of rural Sindhis to the city for work.

Geography and nature 

Sindh is in the western corner of South Asia, bordering the Iranian plateau in the west. Sindh is bounded by the Thar Desert to the east, the Kirthar Mountains to the west and the Arabian Sea and Rann of Kutch to the south. In the centre is a fertile plain along the Indus River.

Sindh is divided into three main geographical regions: Siro ("upper country"), aka Upper Sindh, which is above Sehwan; Vicholo ("middle country"), or Middle Sindh, from Sehwan to Hyderabad; and Lāṟu ("sloping, descending country"), or Lower Sindh, mostly consisting of the Indus Delta below Hyderabad.

Flora 

The province is mostly arid with scant vegetation except for the irrigated Indus Valley. The dwarf palm, Acacia Rupestris (kher), and Tecomella undulata (lohirro) trees are typical of the western hill region. In the Indus valley, the Acacia nilotica (babul) (babbur) is the most dominant and occurs in thick forests along the Indus banks. The Azadirachta indica (neem) (nim), Zizyphys vulgaris (bir) (ber), Tamarix orientalis (jujuba lai) and Capparis aphylla (kirir) are among the more common trees.

Mango, date palms and the more recently introduced banana, guava, orange and chiku are the typical fruit-bearing trees. The coastal strip and the creeks abound in semi-aquatic and aquatic plants and the inshore Indus delta islands have forests of Avicennia tomentosa (timmer) and Ceriops candolleana (chaunir) trees. Water lilies grow in abundance in the numerous lake and ponds, particularly in the lower Sindh region.

Fauna 

Among the wild animals, the Sindh ibex (sareh), blackbuck, wild sheep (Urial or gadh) and wild bear are found in the western rocky range. The leopard is now rare and the Asiatic cheetah extinct. The Pirrang (large tiger cat or fishing cat) of the eastern desert region is also disappearing. Deer occur in the lower rocky plains and in the eastern region, as do the Striped hyena (charakh), jackal, fox, porcupine, common gray mongoose and hedgehog. The Sindhi phekari, red lynx or Caracal cat, is found in some areas. Phartho (hog deer) and wild bear occur, particularly in the central inundation belt. There are bats, lizards and reptiles, including the cobra, lundi (viper) and the mysterious Sindh krait of the Thar region, which is supposed to suck the victim's breath in his sleep.
Some unusual sightings of Asian cheetah occurred in 2003 near the Balochistan border in Kirthar Mountains. The rare houbara bustard find Sindh's warm climate suitable to rest and mate. Unfortunately, it is hunted by locals and foreigners.

Crocodiles are rare and inhabit only the backwaters of the Indus, eastern Nara channel and Karachi backwater. Besides a large variety of marine fish, the plumbeous dolphin, the beaked dolphin, rorqual or blue whale and skates frequent the seas along the Sindh coast. The Pallo (Sable fish), a marine fish, ascends the Indus annually from February to April to spawn. The Indus river dolphin is among the most endangered species in Pakistan and is found in the part of the Indus river in northern Sindh. Hog deer and wild bear occur, particularly in the central inundation belt.

Although Sindh has a semi arid climate, through its coastal and riverine forests, its huge fresh water lakes and mountains and deserts, Sindh supports a large amount of varied wildlife. Due to the semi-arid climate of Sindh the left out forests support an average population of jackals and snakes. The national parks established by the Government of Pakistan in collaboration with many organizations such as World Wide Fund for Nature and Sindh Wildlife Department support a huge variety of animals and birds. The Kirthar National Park in the Kirthar range spreads over more than 3000 km2 of desert, stunted tree forests and a lake. The KNP supports Sindh ibex, wild sheep (urial) and black bear along with the rare leopard. There are also occasional sightings of The Sindhi phekari, ped lynx or Caracal cat. There is a project to introduce tigers and Asian elephants too in KNP near the huge Hub Dam Lake. Between July and November when the monsoon winds blow onshore from the ocean, giant olive ridley turtles lay their eggs along the seaward side. The turtles are protected species. After the mothers lay and leave them buried under the sands the SWD and WWF officials take the eggs and protect them until they are hatched to keep them from predators.

Climate 

Sindh lies in a tropical to subtropical region; it is hot in the summer and mild to warm in winter. Temperatures frequently rise above  between May and August, and the minimum average temperature of  occurs during December and January in the northern and higher elevated regions. The annual rainfall averages about seven inches, falling mainly during July and August. The southwest monsoon wind begins in mid-February and continues until the end of September, whereas the cool northerly wind blows during the winter months from October to January.

Sindh lies between the two monsoons—the southwest monsoon from the Indian Ocean and the northeast or retreating monsoon, deflected towards it by the Himalayan mountains—and escapes the influence of both. The region's scarcity of rainfall is compensated by the inundation of the Indus twice a year, caused by the spring and summer melting of Himalayan snow and by rainfall in the monsoon season.

Sindh is divided into three climatic regions: Siro (the upper region, centred on Jacobabad), Wicholo (the middle region, centred on Hyderabad), and Lar (the lower region, centred on Karachi). The thermal equator passes through upper Sindh, where the air is generally very dry. Central Sindh's temperatures are generally lower than those of upper Sindh but higher than those of lower Sindh. Dry hot days and cool nights are typical during the summer. Central Sindh's maximum temperature typically reaches . Lower Sindh has a damper and humid maritime climate affected by the southwestern winds in summer and northeastern winds in winter, with lower rainfall than Central Sindh.

Major cities

Government

Sindh province 

The Provincial Assembly of Sindh is a unicameral and consists of 168 seats, of which 5% are reserved for non-Muslims and 17% for women. The provincial capital of Sindh is Karachi. The provincial government is led by Chief Minister who is directly elected by the popular and landslide votes; the Governor serves as a ceremonial representative nominated and appointed by the President of Pakistan. The administrative boss of the province who is in charge of the bureaucracy is the Chief Secretary Sindh, who is appointed by the Prime Minister of Pakistan. Most of the influential Sindhi tribes in the province are involved in Pakistan's politics.

In addition, Sindh's politics leans towards the left-wing and its political culture serves as a dominant place for the left-wing spectrum in the country. The province's trend towards the Pakistan Peoples Party (PPP) and away from the Pakistan Muslim League (N) can be seen in nationwide general elections, in which Sindh is a stronghold of the PPP. The PML(N) has a limited support due to its centre-right agenda.

In metropolitan cities such as Karachi and Hyderabad, the MQM (another party of the left with the support of Muhajirs) has a considerable vote bank and support. Minor leftist parties such as the People's Movement also found support in rural areas of the province.

Divisions 

In 2008, after the public elections, the new government decided to restore the structure of Divisions of all provinces. In Sindh after the lapse of the Local Governments Bodies term in 2010 the Divisional Commissioners system was to be restored.

In July 2011, following excessive violence in the city of Karachi and after the political split between the ruling PPP and the majority party in Sindh, the MQM and after the resignation of the MQM Governor of Sindh, PPP and the Government of Sindh decided to restore the commissionerate system in the province. As a consequence, the five divisions of Sindh were restored – namely Karachi, Hyderabad, Sukkur, Mirpurkhas and Larkana with their respective districts. Subsequently, two new divisions have been added in Sindh, Banbore and Nawab Shah/Shaheed Benazirabad division.

Karachi district has been de-merged into its five original constituent districts: Karachi East, Karachi West, Karachi Central, Karachi South and Malir. Recently Korangi has been upgraded to the status of the sixth district of Karachi. These six districts form the Karachi Division now. In 2020, the Kemari District was created after splitting Karachi West District. Currently the Sindh government is planning to divide the Tharparkar district into Tharparkar and Chhachro district.

Districts

Lower-level subdivisions 
In Sindh, talukas are equivalent to the tehsils used elsewhere in the country, supervisory tapas correspond with the kanungo circles used elsewhere, tapas correspond with the patwar circles used in other provinces, and dehs are equivalent to the mouzas used elsewhere.

Towns and villages 
 

Goth Bozo
Kashmir Goth
Khairo Bhatti

Economy

Education 

The following is a chart of the education market of Sindh estimated by the government in 1998:

Major public and private educational institutes in Sindh include:

 Adamjee Government Science College
 Aga Khan University
 APIIT
 Applied Economics Research Centre
 Bahria University
 Baqai Medical University
 Chandka Medical College Larkana
 Cadet College Petaro
 College of Digital Sciences
 College of Physicians & Surgeons Pakistan
 COMMECS Institute of Business and Emerging Sciences
 D. J. Science College
 Dawood University of Engineering & Technology
 Defence Authority Degree College for Men
 Dow International Medical College
 Dow University of Health Sciences
 Fatima Jinnah Dental College
 Federal Urdu University
 GBELS Dourai Mahar Taluka Daur Distt: Shaheed Benazirabad
 Ghulam Muhammad Mahar Medical College Sukkur
 Government College for Men Nazimabad
 Government College Hyderabad
 Government College of Commerce & Economics
 Government College of Technology, Karachi
 Government Degree College Matiari
 Government High School Ranipur
 Government Islamia Science College Sukkur
 Government Muslim Science College Hyderabad
 Government National College (Karachi)
 Greenwich University (Karachi)
 Hamdard University
 Hussain Ebrahim Jamal Research Institute of Chemistry
 Imperial Science College Nawabshah
 Indus Valley Institute of Art and Architecture
 Institute of Business Administration, Karachi
 Institute of Business Administration, Sukkar
 Institute of Business Management
 Institute of Industrial Electronics Engineering
 Institute of Sindhology
 Iqra University
 Islamia Science College (Karachi)
 Isra University Hyderabad
 Jinnah Medical & Dental College
 Jinnah Polytechnic Institute
 Jinnah Post Graduate Medical Centre
 Jinnah University for Women
 KANUPP Institute of Nuclear Power Engineering
 Karachi Institute of Economics and Technology
 Karachi School of Business and Leadership
 Liaquat University of Medical & Health Sciences
 Mehran University of Engineering and Technology
 Mohammad Ali Jinnah University
 National Academy of Performing Arts
 National University of Computer and Emerging Sciences
 National University of Modern Languages
 National University of Sciences and Technology
 NED University of Engineering and Technology
 Ojha Institute of Chest Diseases
 PAF Institute of Aviation Technology
 TES Public School, Daur
 Pakistan Navy Engineering College
 Pakistan Shipowners' College
 Pakistan Steel Cadet College
 Peoples Medical College for Girls Nawabshah
 PIA Training Centre Karachi
 Provincial Institute of Teachers Education Nawabshah
 Public School Hyderabad
 Quaid-e-Awam University of Engineering, Science and Technology, Nawabshah
 Rana Liaquat Ali Khan Government College of Home Economics
 Saint Patrick's College, Karachi
 Shah Abdul Latif Bhitai University
 Shaheed Benazir Bhutto Medical College
 Shaheed Zulfiqar Ali Bhutto Institute of Science and Technology
 Sindh Agriculture University
 Sindh Medical College
 Superior College of Science Hyderabad
 Sindh Muslim Law College
 Sir Syed Government Girls College
 Sir Syed University of Engineering and Technology
 St. Joseph's College
 Sukkur Institute of Science & Technology
 Textile Institute of Pakistan
 University of Karachi
 University of Sindh
 Usman Institute of Technology
 Ziauddin Medical University

Culture 

The rich culture, art and architectural landscape of Sindh have fascinated historians. The culture, folktales, art and music of Sindh form a mosaic of human history.

Cultural heritage 

The work of Sindhi artisans was sold in ancient markets of Damascus, Baghdad, Basra, Istanbul, Cairo and Samarkand. Referring to the lacquer work on wood locally known as Jandi, T. Posten (an English traveller who visited Sindh in the early 19th century) asserted that the articles of Hala could be compared with exquisite specimens of China. Technological improvements such as the spinning wheel (charkha) and treadle (pai-chah) in the weaver's loom were gradually introduced and the processes of designing, dyeing and printing by block were refined. The refined, lightweight, colourful, washable fabrics from Hala became a luxury for people used to the woollens and linens of the age.

Non-governmental organisations (NGOs) such as the World Wildlife Fund, Pakistan, play an important role to promote the culture of Sindh. They provide training to women artisans in Sindh so they get a source of income. They promote their products under the name of "Crafts Forever". Many women in rural Sindh are skilled in the production of caps. Sindhi caps are manufactured commercially on a small scale at New Saeedabad and Hala New. Sindhi people began celebrating Sindhi Topi Day on 6 December 2009, to preserve the historical culture of Sindh by wearing Ajrak and Sindhi topi.

Tourism

See also 

 Arab Sind
 Bagh Prints
 Brahma from Mirpur-Khas
 Debal
 Institute of Sindhology
 List of cities in Sindh
 List of cities in Sindh by population
 List of cultural heritage sites in Sindh
 List of medical schools in Sindh
 List of districts of Pakistan
 List of Sindhi people
 Mansura, Sindh
 Mohenjodaro
 Muhajir Sooba
 Provincial Highways of Sindh
 Sind Division
 Sindh cricket team
 Sindhi clothing
 Sindhu Kingdom
 Sufism in Sindh
 Tomb paintings of Sindh

References

Bibliography

External links 

 Sindh Transport Department official website
 Government of Sindh 
 Guide of Sindh 
 Map of the districts of Sindh
 

 
Provinces of Pakistan
States and territories established in 1970
1970 establishments in Pakistan
Populated places established in the 7th millennium BC
7th-millennium BC establishments